The 2012 London Sevens was the sixth edition of the tournament and the ninth tournament of the 2011–12 IRB Sevens World Series. The host stadium was the Twickenham Stadium.

Fiji won the title by defeating Samoa 38–15 in the final.

Format 
The teams were divided into pools of four teams, who played a round-robin within the pool. Points were awarded in each pool on a different schedule from most rugby tournaments—3 for a win, 2 for a draw, 1 for a loss.
The top two teams in each pool advanced to the Cup competition. The four quarterfinal losers dropped into the bracket for the Plate. The Bowl was contested by the third- and fourth-place finishers in each pool, with the losers in the Bowl quarterfinals dropping into the bracket for the Shield.

Teams 
The following teams participated.

Pool stage
The draw was made on May 6.

Pool A

Pool B

Pool C

Pool D

Knockout stage

Shield

Bowl

Plate

Cup

References

External links

London Sevens
London Sevens
2012
London Sevens
London Sevens